Jazz på svenska ("Jazz in Swedish") is an album by the Swedish jazz pianist Jan Johansson. It was issued in 1964 and consists of jazz arrangements of Swedish folk songs. All arrangements are very sparse, consisting only of Johansson on piano and Georg Riedel on double bass. It went on to become the best selling Swedish jazz album of all time, selling a quarter of a million copies. Many of the tracks hold a distinct renown in Swedish society, especially the lead track "Visa från Utanmyra" (Song from Utanmyra).

In 2005 a remastered version produced by disc label Heptagon Records was released with four bonus tracks on the CD and the full recording sessions (109 minutes) in a data section as mp3 files.

Track listing

Personnel
Main personnel
 Jan Johansson – piano, arrangements
 Georg Riedel – double bass

Additional personnel
 Olof Svembel – engineer
 Tor Alm – Artwork
 Ingmar Glanzelius – liner notes

References

1964 albums
Jan Johansson (jazz musician) albums
Swedish-language albums